Onslow was a Spanish vessel launched in 1789 that was taken in prize in 1795. She became a Liverpool-based slave ship in the triangular trade in enslaved people. She made one complete slave trading voyage before a French privateer captured her in 1797 as she was just on her way to embark slaves for a second voyage.

Career
Onslow first appeared in Lloyd's Register (LR) in 1795.

Slave voyage (1795–17986): Captain William Cartmell sailed from Liverpool on 9 November 1795, bound for the Bight of Benin. Onslow started trading on 22 January 1796, first at Porto-Novo, and then at Whydah. She left Africa on 26 May, bound for the West Indies. She stopped at Prince's Island, and arrived at Barbados on 5 August. She had embarked with 274 slaves and arrived with 274, but finally landed 271, for a 1% mortality rate. She sailed for Liverpool on 20 August and arrived there on 8 October. She had left Liverpool with 19 crew members and had suffered one crew death on her voyage.

After the passage of the Slave Trade Act 1788, masters received a bonus of £100 for a mortality rate of under 2%; the ship's surgeon received £50. For a mortality rate between two and three percent, the bonus was halved. There was no bonus if mortality exceeded 3%.

Fate
Captain James Bailiff sailed from Liverpool on 7 May 1797, bound for West Africa. Lloyd's List reported on 26 May that a French privateer of 14 guns had captured Onslow, Giles, master, as she was sailing from Liverpool to Africa. 

In 1797, 40 British slave ships were lost, 11 of them on the way to Africa. This was the second worst year for losses after the 50 losses in 1795. War, not maritime hazards nor slave resistance, was the greatest cause of vessel losses among British slave vessels.

Notes

Citations

References
 
 
 

1789 ships
Ships built in Spain
Age of Sail merchant ships of England
Liverpool slave ships
Captured ships